Extensor carpi radialis muscle may refer to:

 Extensor carpi radialis brevis muscle
 Extensor carpi radialis longus muscle